Samut Sakhon Province Stadium is a multi-purpose stadium in Samut Sakhon Province, Thailand. It is currently used mostly for football matches. The stadium holds 3,500 people.

References

Football venues in Thailand
Multi-purpose stadiums in Thailand